The Daxian N97 is a Chinese version of the Nokia N97 cell phone. It comes with a 3.0-megapixel camera, TV, FM radio, full qwerty keyboard, and many other features. The phones does not work in the United States but works in Europe. It is not as slim as the Nokia version.

External links
 Daxian N97

Nokia mobile phones
Communications in China